Goliath is a crane in Rosyth Dockyard, Scotland, with a lift capacity of , the largest in Britain.

History
The Goliath was brought to Rosyth from Shanghai in 2011. The crane was used for the assembly of the Queen Elizabeth-class aircraft carriers. The crane, which cost £12.2 million, is part of a £80 million investment at Rosyth to allow the assembly of the aircraft carriers. In 2016, it was announced by the Aircraft Carrier Alliance that the Goliath was to be sold. As of 2019 the decision to sell Goliath has been reversed.

Design
The crane was built by Zhenhua in China, and shipped to the UK partially assembled. After being delivered with the girder and upper sections of the legs assembled, the crane was fully erected on the deck of the ship on which it was transported from Shanghai, before being transferred complete onto its rails. The delivery vessel had to be ballasted considerably in order to ensure a  clearance under the Forth Bridge.

While the three hooks have a greater cumulative lifting capacity than 1,000 tonnes, the total capacity is defined by the crane structure.

References

Individual cranes (machines)
Shipyard cranes
Industry in Scotland
Rosyth
Rosyth